The  is a prefectural museum in Shizuoka City, Japan.

Overviews 

Founded in 1986, the 9,238.51m2 museum is located on a hill on the northern side of the Nihondaira plateau in the southern part of the city.  The 3,024.36m2 domed Rodin wing houses a collection of thirty-two sculptures by French artist Auguste Rodin, including The Thinker, The Gates of Hell, and The Burghers of Calais.

External links

1986 establishments in Japan
Art museums and galleries in Japan
Art museums established in 1986
Museums in Shizuoka Prefecture
Buildings and structures in Shizuoka (city)